Originating in Finland in 2003 with 7 countries, the Karaoke World Championships are an international karaoke competition, featuring approximately 30 countries worldwide. 

USA holds 5 gold medals in solo category. Australia, Panama, Lebanon and UK are tied for the second most solo golds, with three each. 

National trials are conducted in each participating country every year with the winners competing in the international finals for the title of Karaoke World Champion. In 2003-2017 KWC had separate categories for male and female contestants. The 2016 competition introduced the Duet category and in 2018 gender categories were removed. Extra categories in KWC have included KWC Juniors (2017) and Champions Round (2018). 

Finland was the host country for the international finals from 2003 until 2005. In 2006, the finals were held aboard the M/S Galaxy whilst cruising the Baltic Sea from Helsinki to Estonia return. Thailand was the first country to host the finals outside of Finland in September, 2007. In 2008, the event returned to Finland, and was twice consecutively in Lahti Hall.

In December 2005, the top 5 male & female champions of that year were invited to perform for the Princess of Thailand in Bangkok, Thailand in the 'KWC Lights Up The Night' tsunami fundraising concert. The black tie concert was televised throughout Thailand and raised money for the 2004 tsunami victims.

On April 6, 2007, Finnish National Karaoke World Champion 2005 & 3rd place Karaoke World Champion 2005, Ari Koivunen,  Idols, the Finnish version of the UK hit, Pop Idol.

The 2010 World Championships took place in Moscow, Russia between 23 September and 25 September at Forum Center.

The 2011 World Championships took place in Killarney, Ireland between 8 September and 10 September at INEC, Gleneagle.

The 2012 World Championships took place in Lappeenranta, Finland between 28 November and 1 December at Holiday Club Saimaa

The 2013 World Championships took place in Lappeenranta, Finland between 21 November and 23 November at Holiday Club Saimaa

The 2014 World Championships took place in Stockholm, Sweden between 13 November and 15 November at Solidaritet Arena

The 2015 World Championships took place in Singapore between 20 November and 22 November at the Boutique on Orchard Road with a record number of 31 countries participating.

The 2016 World Championships took place in Vancouver, Canada between 1 November and 6 November at Edgewater Casino

The 2017 World Championships took place in Helsinki, Finland between 14 November and 18 November at Telakka Pavilion. 

The 2018 World Championships took place in Helsinki, Finland between 19 December and 21 December at Apollo. 

The 2019 World Championships took place in Tokyo, Japan between 27 November and 29 November at Kanda Myoujin Shrine Hall. 

The 2020 World Championships was conducted as an online competition  due to the COVID-19 pandemic and was held between 2 November and 7 November.

The 2021 World Championship was again an online competition held between 13 and 27 November.

The 2022 World Championships took place in Nes Kulturhus in Årnes, Norway, between 8 and 13 August.

Participating Countries

Previous winners

References

External links 
 Karaoke World Championships Official Webpage
 Karaoke World Championships List of Countries

Singing competitions
Karaoke